Hermetiomima is a genus of flies in the family Stratiomyidae.

Species
Hermetiomima melaleuca Grünberg, 1915
Hermetiomima rufipes Lindner, 1938

References

Stratiomyidae
Brachycera genera
Taxa named by Karl Grünberg
Diptera of Africa